The King's Avatar may refer to:
 The King's Avatar (2017 web series)
 The King's Avatar (2019 TV series)